Gusti Ayu Karang was a regent in the Kingdom of Klungkung (Indonesia) from 1809 to 1814. 

Her home kingdom was the Kingdom of Karangasem. She was the mother of Dewa Agung Istri Kanya, whose father and co-regent was Dewa Agung Putra I. She invented new conditions for Dewa Agung Istri Kanya to become the "Virgin Queen of Klungkung."

References

Monarchs of Bali
1814 deaths
19th-century women rulers
19th-century Indonesian women